Media Source Inc. (MSI) is an American company based in Plain City, Ohio. It began in 1980 as Pages and changed its name in March 1999. It owns Horn Book, including The Horn Book Magazine, Junior Library Guild, Library Hotline, Library Journal (acquired in 2010), and School Library Journal (acquired in 2010), and Digital Shift.  All of these holdings are under its subsidiary MSI Information Services, the primary trade name under which the company does business. MSI was purchased by the private equity firm RLJ Equity Partners in 2011.

References

External links 
 

Magazine publishing companies of the United States
Companies based in Ohio
Union County, Ohio
Publishing companies established in 1980
1980 establishments in Ohio